Pedro Bastidas (17 January 1976 – 19 April 2021) was a Venezuelan politician. He also worked as an agricultural technician and held a degree in market research. He died of COVID-19 on 19 April 2021, at the age of 45.

Career
In the 2008 Venezuelan regional elections, he was elected Mayor of the Girardot Municipality over Justice First candidate Richard Mardo by just 151 votes. He took office on 1 December 2008. In 2009, he created the state-owned enterprise "Fábrica de Sueños", which provided toys for poor children in the region. In 2010, he provided universal Wi-Fi to the municipality at eight different locations across Maracay. That same year, he founded Radio Girardot 96.1 FM, on which he hosted his personal radio show, Conversando y Construyendo con Pedro Bastidas. He also created a recording studio to feature local and national talent in Venezuela.

In 2011, Bastidas' office helped form the union Plástico-Productiva Socialista, which produced water tanks, traffic cones, garbage cans, and several other plastic products. As part of his policy for renewal and urban planning, he approved the construction of markets for informal traders in Maracay. He also helped ease traffic in areas of high congestion with squares, walkways, and courtyards. An asphalt plant was also created in Girardot, built to ease the difficulty of obtaining asphalt through the private sector. The Girardot Municipality's Mayoral Office has overseen the plant since December 2013.

In the 2013 elections, Bastidas was re-elected as Mayor of Girardot Municipality with 51.53% of the votes, aided by support from the Great Patriotic Pole. He was sworn in on 13 December 2013. In his second term, he was heavily focused on urban development and planning.

References

1976 births
2021 deaths
Venezuelan politicians
United Socialist Party of Venezuela politicians
Mayors of places in Venezuela
People from Maracay
Deaths from the COVID-19 pandemic in Venezuela